Pallapalayam is a Town panchayat in Coimbatore district in the Indian state of Tamil Nadu.

Demographics
 India census, The Pallapalayam city is divided into 15 wards for which elections are held every 5 years. The Pallapalayam Town Panchayat has population of 11,910 of which 5,993 are males while 5,917 are females.

Population of Children with age of 0-6 is 1074 which is 9.02% of total population of Pallapalayam (TP). In Pallapalayam Town Panchayat, Female Sex Ratio is of 987 against state average of 996. Moreover, Child Sex Ratio in Pallapalayam is around 908 compared to Tamil Nadu state average of 943.

Politics
The town is divided into 15 Wards in 3 Hamlets named Pallapalayam, Bharathipuram and Gandhinagar.

Pallapalayam is a part of Sulur (state assembly constituency) and Coimbatore (Lok Sabha constituency).

Climate
Pallapalayam has a pleasant, salubrious climate, not reaching the high temperatures of other southern India cities/ towns.

Geography 

References

Cities and towns in Coimbatore district
Suburbs of Coimbatore